True Religion Brand Jeans is an American clothing company established in April 2002 by Jeff Lubell and Kym Gold and is based in Vernon, California.

Overview 
True Religion brand designer jeans are manufactured from premium denim they also make Designer clothing. Some of which is made in the United States. In 2009, True Religion was sold in about 900 boutiques and specialty stores in 50 countries on six continents. In May 2021, the company owned 50 retail stores in 30 countries.

History
Unusually, the brand began with the 2002 production of about 14,000 pairs of jeans, being, the co-founder Lubell has remarked, contrary to the typical business model, in which "you make a sample line, go to market, get orders, and ship your production." The company adopted a business model in which everything was outsourced, depending on contractors "to do everything."

Its flagship store opened in 2005, in Manhattan Beach, California. True Religion products are also sold at major department stores, including Von Maur, Nordstrom, Bloomingdales, Saks Fifth Avenue.

In November 2019, the company's former president Michael Buckley was appointed CEO, returning to aid in recovery from bankruptcy. Subsequently, Buckley re-hired designer Zihaad Wells as creative director, who had, in late 2006, resigned from Levi’s in Europe to join True Religion, also at Buckley's request.

Following two bankruptcy filings, in 2017 and 2020, the brand closed some stores. The company appeared to rebound in 2021, with sales topping $235 million.

2013 acquisition by Towerbrook
True Religion was purchased by TowerBrook Capital Partners on May 10, 2013. The acquisition provided shareholders a 52% premium to True Religion's share price on October 9, 2012. The stock had fallen 40% in 2012 up to October 9, 2012, due to a poor pre-Christmas sales in 2011, and concern that a shrinking number of shoppers were willing to purchase True Religion's high-priced jeans. Forbes also noted that, over the prior three years, True Religion shares had gained just 11.6% while shares in comparable luxury-goods companies VF Corporation, Ralph Lauren Corporation, and PVH Corp. had each more than doubled in value. Prior to the purchase, True Religion traded on NASDAQ under the symbol TRLG.

Bankruptcies 
True Religion filed for Chapter 11 bankruptcy protection on July 5, 2017, acknowledging that it had $534.7 million in liabilities and only $243.3 million in assets. It then announced the closure of 27 stores in the United States.

In April 2020, the design company again filed for bankruptcy, closing 37 locations, resulting in a total of 49 stores remaining. The second bankruptcy was completed in November 2020, and the company was considered to have rebounded the following year.

See also
Retail apocalypse

References

External links
 
 True Religion Apparel, Inc. financials

Jeans by brand
Clothing brands of the United States
2000s fashion
2010s fashion
Companies based in Los Angeles County, California
American companies established in 2002
Clothing companies established in 2002
2002 establishments in California
Manhattan Beach, California
Companies based in Vernon, California
2013 mergers and acquisitions
Companies that filed for Chapter 11 bankruptcy in 2017
Companies that filed for Chapter 11 bankruptcy in 2020